Roger Martin may refer to:
 Roger Martin (recusant) (c. 1526/7–1615)
 Sir Roger Martin, 1st Baronet (1639–1712)
 Sir Roger Martin, 2nd Baronet (1667–1742)
 Sir Roger Martin, 3rd Baronet (1689–1762)
 Sir Roger Martin, 5th Baronet (1778–1854)
 Roger E. Martin (born 1935), American businessman and Oregon state legislator and lobbyist
 Roger Martin (diplomat) (born 1941), Chair to Board of Trustees, Population Matters (formerly Optimum Population Trust)
 Roger H. Martin (born 1943), president of Randolph–Macon College
 Roger Martin (professor) (born 1956), former Dean of the Rotman School of Management at the University of Toronto
 Roger Martin (actor) (born 1950), British actor
 Roger Dale Martin, heavy metal musician

See also